Alexei Borisovich Aleksandrov, (Алексей Борисович Александров, born 23 December 1954) is a Russian mathematician, specializing in mathematical analysis.

Aleksandrov received in 1979 his Russian candidate degree (Ph.D.) from the Leningrad State University under Victor Havin with thesis Hardy Classes Hp for p∈(0,1) (Rational Approximation, Backward Shift Operator, Cauchy-Stieltjes Type Integral (title translated from the Russian). In 1984 he received in 1984 his Russian doctorate (higher doctoral degree) and is now a professor at the Steklov Institute of Mathematics.

His research deals with, among other topics, function theory in the unit ball, Hardy spaces, shift operators, and Hadamard gap series.

In 1982 he received the Salem Prize. In 1986 he was an Invited Speaker at the ICM in Berkeley, California.

Selected publications
(with English translations of Russian titles)
 Gap series and pseudocontinuations. An arithmetic approach, Algebra i Analiz, vol. 9, 1997, pp. 3–31
Function theory in the ball, Itogi Nauki i Tekhniki. Ser. Sovrem. Probl. Mat. Fund. Napr., vol. 8, 1985,  pp. 115–190
Inner functions on compact spaces, Functional Analysis and Applications, vol. 18, 1984, pp.  1-13
The existence of inner functions in the ball, Mat. Sbornik, vol. 118, 1982, pp. 147–163
 Spectral subspaces of Lp for p < 1, Algebra i Analiz, tom 19 (2007), nomer 3. trans. in: St. Petersburg Math. J. vol. 19, 2008, pp. 327–374 
 with V. V. Peller: Functions of perturbed dissipative operators, Algebra i Analiz, tom 23 (2011), nomer 2. trans. in: St. Petersburg Math. J. vol. 23, 2012, pp. 209–238

See also
Aleksandrov-Clark measure

References

External links
mathnet.ru 

20th-century Russian mathematicians
21st-century Russian mathematicians
Saint Petersburg State University alumni
1954 births
Living people